Battling Mason is a 1924 American silent comedy drama film directed by William James Craft and Jack Nelson and starring Frank Merrill, Eva Novak and Joseph W. Girard.

Synopsis
Mason a young New Yorker, who loves a fight, runs for public office. As part of his election campaign he agrees not to get involved in any fights and refuses to respond with violence to even the most heavy provocation. All this disappoints his wealthy uncle who mistakenly believes that it is due to cowardice.

Cast
 Frank Merrill as 	Mason
 Eva Novak
 Joseph W. Girard
 Milburn Morante
 William Elmer 
 Dick Sutherland

References

Bibliography
 Connelly, Robert B. The Silents: Silent Feature Films, 1910-36, Volume 40, Issue 2. December Press, 1998.
 Munden, Kenneth White. The American Film Institute Catalog of Motion Pictures Produced in the United States, Part 1. University of California Press, 1997.

External links
 

1924 films
1924 comedy-drama films
1920s English-language films
American silent feature films
American black-and-white films
Films directed by William James Craft
Films directed by Jack Nelson
1920s American films
Silent American comedy-drama films